Never Ending is reggae artist Beres Hammond's nineteenth studio album, released on October 12, 2018. It debuted at number one on the Billboard Reggae chart. The 14-track album was recorded in Kingston, Jamaica.

Background
Themes on the album include love, overcoming obstacles and celebrating life. Never Ending includes a love song about Jamaica called "Land of Sunshine." The lead single, "I'm Alive", is a 21st-century 'roots' track with Hammond singing praises for life's simple and essential joys. "My Kinda Girl" is an example of modern lovers rock – a sub genre of reggae for which the artist is known. Hammond is known to be in the studio three or four times a week when he is in Jamaica.  He records songs based on events that happen naturally in life.  He is known to visit people - whom he does not know – but who enjoy sharing stories about their lives with him.  He internalizes those experiences and records them in song.

The visual for the "Never Ending" music video was directed by RD Studios and portrays Hammond's childhood. Fans are shown the beginning of his love for music to his current-day performing in front of Harmony House – his recording studio on Dumbarton Avenue.  Throughout the four-minute video, artistes influenced by Hammond make a cameo. They include Jah Cure, Alborosie, Romain Virgo, Christopher Martin, Shenseea, Jesse Royal, Bulby York, Kurt Riley, and Teflon Zinc Fence.

Track listing

Personnel

Andre Riley - Producer
Barry O'Hare - Mixing Engineer
Beres Hammond - Executive Producer, Primary Artist, Producer, Vocals (Background)
Billy Lawrence - Percussion
Carroll "Bowie" McLaughlin - Keyboards
Christina Chin - Art Direction, Creative Director
Christopher Birch - Keyboards, Piano
Christopher Chin - Executive Producer
Christopher Scott - Mastering
Collin "Bulby" York - Mixing Engineer
Danny "Axeman" Thompson - Bass
Dave "Fluxy" Heywood - Drums
Dave Heywood - Composer
Dean Fraser - Horn
Deron James - Production Art
Devario Jones - Engineer
Donaldson Bernard - Keyboards
Dorrett Wisdom - Vocals (Background)
Dwain "Wiya" Campbell-Fletcher - Keyboards
Dwight Richards - Horn
Errol Brown - Mixing Engineer
Errol Graham - Percussion
Errol Carter - Bass
Franklin Waul - Keyboards
Gregory Morris - Mixing Engineer
Handel Tucker - Keyboards
Heather Cummings - Vocals (Background)

Hugh Hammond - Composer
Jordan Morris - Photography
Kenyatta Hill - Engineer
Kirk Bennett - Drums
Kurt Riley - Composer, Producer
Lamont “Monty” Savory - Guitar
Lerory "Mafia" Heywood - Bass, Keyboards
Leroy Heywood - Composer
Lloyd Denton - Drums, Keyboards, Piano
Michael Fletcher - Bass, Composer
Michael Gayle - Engineer
Mitchum Chin - Guitar
Neil "Diamond" Edwards - A&R
Rebecca Lovinsquy - Graphic Design, Logo
Richard Brown - Engineer
Richard Lue - Project Manager
Robbie Lyn - Keyboards
Robert Angus - Guitar
Sly Dunbar - Drums
Solomon Salmon - Engineer
Stephanie Chin - Art Direction, Creative Director
Steven Stanley - Mixing Engineer
Style Scott - Drums
Tony Phillips - Guitar
Trevor McKenzie - Bass
Willie Lindo - Guitar
Winston "Bo Peep" Bowen - Guitar

Never Ending Tour
Never Ending Tour 2019 of the United States and Canada started on July 27 from Danbury Connecticut, U.S.A., and stopped in Baltimore, Cincinnati, Chicago, Boston, Toronto, Brooklyn, Philadelphia, Newark, Huntington (New York), Richmond (Virginia), Washington DC, Norfolk (Virginia), Charlotte (North Carolina), Atlanta, Orlando, and Fort Lauderdale.

Never Ending Tour 2019 Schedule

References

2018 albums
Beres Hammond albums